Dušan "Duško" Radović (29 November 1922 – 16 August 1984) was a Yugoslav writer, journalist, aphorist and a poet.

Biography
He was known for his poetry (especially children's poetry), books, television screenplays, and for his aphorisms.
He was the editor in chief of "Pionirske novine", editor of Children's programme on Radio Belgrade and Radio-Television Belgrade, editor of the children's magazine "Poletarac", journalist at the Borba newspaper. From 1975 onwards he was the editor of radio Studio B. An athletic race "Remembering Duško Radović" was held in Belgrade for many years. Duško's brother is well-known athletic trainer Branimir "Brana" Radović.

His works have been translated into all major world languages. Radović is the recipient of the most notable awards: Neven (Calendula), Mlado pokolenje (Young Generation), the award of Zmaj Children Games, the award of Sterijino pozorje, Seventh of July award, and the scroll of honour of the Hans Christian Andersen International Organization of Children's Literature.

Selected works
 "Kapetan Džon Piplfoks" (Captain John Peoplefox) (1953), radio drama
 Poštovana deco (Respected Children) (1954), poems
 Smešne reči (Funny Words) (1961), poems
 Pričam ti priču (I'm telling you a story) (1963), poems and stories
 Na slovo, na slovo (By letter, by letter) (1963–1965), television serial
 Če, tragedija koja traje (Che, A Tragedy that Continues) (1969. with M. Bećković), epic
 Vukova azbuka (Vuk's Alphabet) (1971), poems
 Zoološki vrt (Zoo) (1972), poems
 Beograde, dobro jutro 1 (Good Morning Belgrade, 1) (1977), aphorisms
 Beograde, dobro jutro 2 (Good Morning Belgrade, 2) (1981), aphorisms
 Ponedeljak, Utorak, Sreda, Četvrtak (Monday, Tuesday, Wednesday, Thursday), poetry and prose for children in four volumes
 Beograde, dobro jutro 3 (Good Morning Belgrade, 3) (1984), aphorisms.

Famous aphorisms

 "Parents, spank your kids as soon as you notice that they resemble you."
 "It is difficult to be a kid and to be good."
 "If you solve all of your kids' problems, they will have no other problem than you."
 "To have friends means to accept that there are more beautiful, smarter, and better people than you. Those, who cannot accept that, have no friends."

References

External links 
 Duško Radović works, including "Beograde Dobrojutro" ("Good morning Belgrade") in translation
 Little Theatre Duško Radović : ABOUT DUŠKO RADOVIĆ

1922 births
1984 deaths
Writers from Niš
Serbian male poets
Serbian children's writers
20th-century Serbian poets
Aphorists
Burials at Belgrade New Cemetery
Yugoslav poets
Yugoslav writers